Robert Brian Conley is an American lawyer serving as an associate justice of the Kentucky Supreme Court.

Education and legal career 

Conley attended Russell High School in Flatwoods, Kentucky in 1976. He received his Bachelor of Science from the University of Kentucky in 1981 and his Juris Doctor from the Salmon P. Chase College of Law in 1984., while at the University of Kentucky and during his first year in law school, he worked for ARMCO Steel Inc. as a steelworker. Prior to his judicial career, he was an associate with the law firm McKenzie, Woolery & Eurick PSC and then as a corporate attorney with Addington Mining/Addington Environmental Inc.

Judicial career 

Conley was elected district judge in 1995 and served in that capacity until being elected as circuit judge in 2006.

Kentucky Supreme Court 

On January 10, 2020, Conley filed to be a candidate for associate justice of the Kentucky Supreme Court. Conley and his opponent, Chris Harris, both received the most votes in the June primary, advancing them to the general election. During his run for the Kentucky Supreme Court he was sanctioned by the Judicial Conduct Commission in part for throwing a man in jail for three days for contempt of court without conducting a hearing. Conley went on to explain his conduct in that case due to extreme fatigue from the flu, saying he said he lost his temper and “it was a bad day". On November 3, 2020, he won the general election against his opponent State Representative Chris Harris. He was sworn in on January 1, 2021. His term started on January 4, 2021.

Personal life 

Conley was married to the late Melanie Stephens Conley for 28 years and is a father of two. Conley has described himself as a Christian conservative.

Electoral history

References

External links 

Living people
Year of birth missing (living people)
Place of birth missing (living people)
20th-century American lawyers
21st-century American judges
21st-century American lawyers
Christians from Kentucky
Justices of the Kentucky Supreme Court
Kentucky lawyers
Kentucky Republicans
Kentucky state court judges
Salmon P. Chase College of Law alumni
University of Kentucky alumni